Apartment House 1776 is a 1976 composition by the American composer John Cage, composed for the United States Bicentennial and premiered by six orchestras across the country in 1976. The work was commissioned jointly by the orchestras of Boston, Chicago, Cleveland, Los Angeles, New York, and Philadelphia. In these performances, the work was performed together with Cage's 1975–76 orchestral work Renga.

Structure
Following Cage's Musicircus principle (featuring what he called a "multiplicity of centers"), the work calls for four solo vocalists, each representing a different religious tradition in the United States: Protestant, Sephardic, Native American, and African American. The singers, who represent the four religious traditions practiced at the U.S.'s founding in 1776, select authentic songs from their respective traditions and sing them without attempting to match them to those of the other singers.

The soloists for the original performances were Helen Schneyer (Protestant), Nico Castel (Sephardic), Swift Eagle (Native American – Apache and Santo Domingo Pueblo), and Jeanne Lee (African American). The original performances were conducted by Seiji Ozawa (Boston), Pierre Boulez (New York) and Zubin Mehta (Los Angeles) .

The singers are accompanied by versions of anthems and congregational music written by composers who were at least 20 years old at the time of the American Revolution, which Cage recomposed by means of chance operations. The composers whose works are so used include William Billings, James Lyon, Jacob French, Andrew Law, and Supply Belcher. In addition, Cage provides four marches for solo drums (transcribed by James Barnes from Benjamin Clark's Drum Book of 1797) and 14 tunes for melody instruments, which are based on dance or military tunes of the period.

Recordings
1994 – John Cage: Orchestral Works I (Mode)

See also
List of compositions by John Cage

References
Cage, John, and Richard Kostelanetz (1988). "His Own Music: Part Two — Ur-Conversation With John Cage produced by Richard Kostelanetz." Perspectives of New Music, vol. 26, no. 1 (Winter 1988), pp. 26–49.
Fetterman, William (1996). John Cage's Theatre Pieces: Notations and Performances. Routledge. .
Fleming, Shirley (1976). "Music Notes: Asked for One, Cage Writes Two; Music Notes: Two From John Cage." The New York Times, September 19, 1976.
Henahan, Donal (1976). "John Cage, Elfin Enigma, at 64; Reappraising John Cage, Elfin Enigma at 64." The New York Times, October 22, 1976.
Henahan, Donal (1976). "Music: Cage's Renga Gives Lift To Festival of Modern Works." The New York Times, October 29, 1976
Hughes, Allen (1976). "Hundreds Walk Out of Premiere Of John Cage Work at Fisher Hall." The New York Times, November 5, 1976.
Johnson, Tom (1989). The Voice of New Music: New York City 1972–1982 — A Collection of Articles Originally Published by the Village Voice, pp. 247–248. Eindhoven, Netherlands: Het Apollohuis. .
Kostelanetz, Richard (2003). Conversing With Cage, p. 126. Routledge. .
Pritchett, James (1993). The Music of John Cage. Cambridge University Press. .
"The Week's Concerts; Today." The New York Times, February 20, 1977.

External links
Apartment House 1776 page

Compositions by John Cage
1976 compositions
1976 in the United States
Music commissioned by the Boston Symphony Orchestra
Music commissioned by the Chicago Symphony Orchestra
Music commissioned by the Cleveland Orchestra
Music commissioned by the Los Angeles Philharmonic
Music commissioned by the New York Philharmonic
Music commissioned by the Philadelphia Orchestra